Severin Eisenberger (1879 in Krakau, Austrian Galicia – 1945 in New York) was a Polish concert pianist, composer and teacher.

Eisenberger was a student of Heinrich Ehrlich in Berlin and Theodor Leschetizky in Vienna. He made his debut at the age of 10 in Kraków in a performance of Beethoven's Piano Concerto no.2 in B-flat.  After settling in the United States in 1928, he taught at the Cincinnati College Conservatory of Music, and continued to concertize actively. Eisenberger frequently performed with many of the world's leading orchestras, including the Cleveland Orchestra. In 1931 he gave that Orchestra's first performance of Mozart's Piano Concerto No. 24 in C minor, K.491. His concerts included notable cycles of Beethoven's 32 Piano Sonatas.

Several CD recordings of Eisenberger's playing have been released by Pearl and Arbiter records, including performances of the Grieg Piano Concerto in A minor and the Chopin 2nd Piano Concerto in F minor (recorded c. 1938). Eisenberger was reported to have performed the Grieg concerto under the composer's baton. Allan Evans calls Eisenberger "a distant figure who once was among the commanding keyboard masters to perform throughout Central Europe and the United States."

A number of Eisenberger's pupils achieved distinguished careers as concert pianists, composers and teachers, including Lili Kraus, Heinrich Kaminski, Sylvia Straus Heschel, Herbert Haufrecht, Jeanette Tillett, and Vivien Harvey Slater, his teaching assistant until 1945, who later recorded five LP records of the music of Leschetizky's teacher, Carl Czerny (Musical Heritage Society).

Eisenberger's daughter was Agnes Eisenberger, concert artist manager, and editor of The Brahms Notebooks.

References

External links 
 Allan Evans' article on Eisenberger at Arbiter Records

Jewish classical musicians
Polish classical pianists
American classical pianists
Male classical pianists
American male pianists
Jews from Galicia (Eastern Europe)
American people of Polish-Jewish descent
American people of Austrian-Jewish descent
Musicians from Kraków
Academic staff of the Academy of Music in Kraków
1879 births
1945 deaths
Polish emigrants to the United States